William II (27 May 1626 – 6 November 1650) was sovereign Prince of Orange and Stadtholder of Holland, Zeeland, Utrecht, Guelders, Overijssel and Groningen in the United Provinces of the Netherlands from 14 March 1647 until his death three years later. His only child, William III, reigned as King of England, Ireland, and Scotland.

Early life
William II, Prince of Orange, was the son of Frederick Henry, Prince of Orange, and Amalia of Solms-Braunfels. Frederick Henry was the youngest son of William the Silent (stadtholder 1559–1584); his older half brother Maurits of Nassau was stadtholder (1585–1625); he was stadtholder from 1625 to 1647. The stadtholders governed in conjunction with the States-General, an assembly of representatives from each of the seven provinces, but usually dominated by the largest and wealthiest province, Holland.

On 12 May 1641, William married Mary, Princess Royal, who was the eldest daughter of King Charles I of England, in the Chapel Royal of Whitehall Palace in London. William was not yet fifteen, while Mary was just nine at that time.

Reign

In 1647, his father, Frederick Henry died, and William II succeeded to both his hereditary titles and his elective offices as stadtholder of six of the seven provinces: Holland, Zeeland, Utrecht, Guelders, Overijssel and Groningen.

The Netherlands at this time was engaged in the Eighty Years' War against Spain for its independence. Under Frederick Henry, the Netherlands had largely won the war, and since 1646 had been negotiating with Spain on the terms for ending it.

The negotiators agreed to the Peace of Münster in 1648, but William opposed acceptance of the treaty, even though it recognized the independence of the (northern) Netherlands, because it left the southern Netherlands in the hands of the Spanish monarchy. A separate peace furthermore violated the alliance with France formed in 1635. However, the States of six provinces voted to accept it.

Secretly, William opened his own negotiations with France with the goal of extending his own territory under a more centralized government. In addition, he worked for the restoration of his exiled brother-in-law, Charles II, to the throne of England.

In 1650 William II became involved in a bitter quarrel with the province of Holland and the powerful Regents of Amsterdam, Andries Bicker and his cousin Cornelis de Graeff. With the Peace of Münster, the Regents wanted to reduce the army, saving money.  That would also diminish William's authority. William imprisoned eight members of the States of Holland (including Jacob de Witt) in the castle of Loevestein. In addition, he sent his cousin, Willem Frederik of Nassau-Dietz with an army of 10,000 men to seize Amsterdam by force. Bad weather foiled this campaign, but Amsterdam did give in.

William served as stadtholder for only three years, until he died of smallpox in 1650. His only son William was born one week after his death. This was the beginning of the First Stadtholderless Period. His son succeeded him in 1672 as stadtholder and later, in 1689, also became King of England.

Arms
William II used the following arms during his time as prince of Orange, Stadholder or Holland, etc., and Captain-General:

Depictions

Ancestors

References

Bibliography
 Herbert H. Rowen, The princes of Orange: the stadholders in the Dutch Republic. Cambridge and New York: Cambridge University Press, 1988.
 Herbert H. Rowen, The princes of Orange: the stadholders in the Dutch Republic. Cambridge and New York: Cambridge University Press, 2003.
 Herbert H. Rowen, "John de Witt, Grand Pensionary of Holland, 1625–1672". Princeton, N.J.: Princeton University Press, 1978.
 Herbert H. Rowen, "John de Witt: Statesman of the "True Freedom"". Cambridge University Press, 2003.
 
 Petrus Johannes Blok, "History of the people of the Netherlands". New York:  G. P. Putnam's sons, 1898.
 Pieter Geyl, "Orange and Stuart, 1641–1672". Scribner, 1970.
 Jonathan I. Israel, "The Dutch Republic: Its Rise, Greatness, and Fall, 1477–1806" Oxford University Press, 1995.

External links

|-

|-

Counts of Nassau
Princes of Orange
Lords of Breda
Dutch stadtholders
House of Orange-Nassau
Nobility from The Hague
Deaths from smallpox
1626 births
1650 deaths
Infectious disease deaths in the Netherlands
Burials in the Royal Crypt at Nieuwe Kerk, Delft
William III of England